Twilight is a borough in Washington County, Pennsylvania, United States. The population was 216 at the 2020 census.

Geography
Twilight is located at  (40.114307, -79.890369).

Surrounding neighborhoods
Twilight has four borders, including Charleroi to the north, Speers to the east and northeast, Long Branch to the south, and Fallowfield Township to the west.

Demographics

As of the census of 2000, there were 241 people, 96 households, and 74 families living in the borough. The population density was 149.9 people per square mile (57.8/km2). There were 103 housing units at an average density of 64.1 per square mile (24.7/km2). The racial makeup of the borough was 99.17% White and 0.83% African American.

There were 96 households, out of which 29.2% had children under the age of 18 living with them, 66.7% were married couples living together, 8.3% had a female householder with no husband present, and 22.9% were non-families. 19.8% of all households were made up of individuals, and 10.4% had someone living alone who was 65 years of age or older. The average household size was 2.51 and the average family size was 2.89.

In the borough the population was spread out, with 19.9% under the age of 18, 4.6% from 18 to 24, 27.8% from 25 to 44, 28.6% from 45 to 64, and 19.1% who were 65 years of age or older. The median age was 43 years. For every 100 females there were 94.4 males. For every 100 females age 18 and over, there were 99.0 males.

The median income for a household in the borough was $40,833, and the median income for a family was $44,688. Males had a median income of $41,071 versus $22,813 for females. The per capita income for the borough was $22,236. About 7.5% of families and 10.5% of the population were below the poverty line, including 17.1% of those under the age of eighteen and none of those 65 or over.

References

Boroughs in Washington County, Pennsylvania
Populated places established in 1893
Pittsburgh metropolitan area
1893 establishments in Pennsylvania